Govindan Vijayaraghavan is a cardiologist from India, credited with establishing the first 2D Echocardiography laboratory in India. He is the vice-chairman & Founder Director of the Kerala Institute of Medical Sciences and the President of the Society for Continuing Medical Education and Research, Trivandrum, Kerala. He was honoured by Government of India in 2009 for his services in the field of medical sciences by awarding him Padmashri.

Life Sketch
Vijayaraghavan was born at Perumpuzha, Kollam, Kerala on 18 September 1942 as the son of Sahithya Siromany M. K. Govindan, a Sanskrit scholar. He did his early schooling in Trivandrum Model School and graduated in Medicine from Trivandrum Medical College in 1964 and passed MD in General Medicine in 1969. He continued his studies at Christian Medical College, Vellore, obtained his Doctorate in Cardiology (DM) in 1973 and started his career there as associate professor. He moved back to Thiruvananthapuram Medical College in 1976 and continued his research on Endomyocardial Fibrosis, a variety of heart disease found common in Kerala, in association with Post-graduate Medical School and Brompton Hospital, London.

Vijayaraghavan is known to be proficient in many languages and resides in Thiruvananthapuram with his family.

Career
 More details on personal web site
Vijayaraghavan's research findings on endomyocardial fibrosis are widely considered to be path breaking. His research on Cerebra Odollum poisoning (a suicidal plant poison used by poor people of South India) helped to introduce innovative treatment modalities, which is reported to be still in use. In 1983 he was invited to work at the University of California, Los Angeles, and became one of the pioneer research workers in Doppler echocardiography and co-authored the first book on this subject from USA (1985).

Vijayaraghavan is a well-known teacher in cardiology in India and abroad. His effort in the 1980s in conducting continuing medical education programme all over India resulted in establishment of 2-D echocardiography as the most popular cardiology investigation in this country. As Professor and Head of Cardiology, Vijayaraghavan established one of the most modern cardiology departments in this country at the Trivandrum Medical College. With help from the World Health Organization and Government of India he demonstrated that heart attacks and its risk factors are very highly prevalent among the poor people of Kerala. He is the current editor-in-chief of the Indian Journal of Clinical Cardiology (IJCC)

He received honorary fellowships from the Royal College of Physicians of Edinburgh, the Royal College of Physicians of London (FRCP London), from the American College of Cardiology, the Premier Golden Heart Fellowship the American Heart Association, the Indian College of Cardiology, Indian Academy of Echocardiography, International Medical Sciences Academy and the Cardiological Society of India. He was elected as the chief patron of Indian Association of Clinical Cardiologists during the annual scientific session IACCCON 2010 at Thiruvananthapuram.

He is a member of the editorial board of the Indian Edition of the American Heart Association journals, Circulation & Hypertension and is the Chairman of the Echocardiology Council of the Cardiological Society of India. He is also a University Guide for PhD in Cardiology, Kerala University from 1984.

Awards
 Padmashri by Government of India
 Lifetime Achievement Award by Indian Academy of Echocardiography
 Lifetime Achievement Award by Indian College of Cardiology
 Lifetime Achievement Award by Cardiological Society of India

Lifetime achievement awards were given to him by Indian Academy of Echocardiography, Indian College of cardiology and the Cardiological Society of India.

Works
 More details on personal web site Bibliography

English publications

Malayalam Publications

Dr Vijayaraghavan has published several papers, articles and journals, both in India and abroad and has also several review articles and abstracts to his credit. He has also participated in many conferences around the world.

References

Further reading
 Paper in U.S. National Library of Medicine
 in European Heart Journal
 
 on Govt of India web site

External links
 Web Site
 KIMS Web Site 
 Profile on Doctors' Cabin 
 in The Hindu daily

1942 births
University of Kerala alumni
Malayali people
Recipients of the Padma Shri in medicine
Living people
Indian cardiologists
Indian medical academics
Indian medical writers
20th-century Indian medical doctors
Scientists from Kerala
People from Kollam district